Harold David Mair, OAM (2 June 1919 – 7 September 2011) was an Australian politician. Mair was mayor of Albury from 1976 until 1977. In 1978, he was elected to the New South Wales Legislative Assembly as the member for Albury, representing the Labor Party. He was only the second Labor member ever to win Albury since it was recreated in 1927, and to date the only Labor member to hold this traditionally conservative seat for more than one term.

In 1988 he lost his seat to the Liberal Party's Ian Glachan, who had been his opponent in 1984.

A footbridge constructed as part of the Hume Freeway project in Albury, which replaced the Dean Street Bridge, was named after Harold Mair.

References

 

Members of the New South Wales Legislative Assembly
1919 births
2011 deaths
Mayors of places in New South Wales
Recipients of the Medal of the Order of Australia
People from Albury, New South Wales
Australian Labor Party members of the Parliament of New South Wales